The Mathias River is a river of the Canterbury region of New Zealand's South Island. It flows from its origins in three rivers (the North, South, and West Mathias Rivers) in the Southern Alps. Of these, the North Mathias River is the longest, flowing predominantly southwards from its source northeast of Mount Williams.

The river was named by Sir Julius von Haast after his companion Alured George Mathias, during his Rakaia trip.

See also
List of rivers of New Zealand

References

Rivers of Canterbury, New Zealand
Rivers of New Zealand